Beneath the Magic is a 1950 novel by the British writer Robert Hichens about a concert pianist. It was released in the United States under the alternative title of Strange Lady. It was one of the final works of Hichens, a romantic novelist whose career stretched back to the Victorian era.

References

Bibliography
 Vinson, James. Twentieth-Century Romance and Gothic Writers. Macmillan, 1982.

1950 British novels
Novels by Robert Hichens 
Hutchinson (publisher) books